There are 23 counties in the U.S. state of Wyoming. There were originally five counties in the Wyoming Territory: Laramie and Carter, established in 1867; Carbon and Albany established in 1868; and Uinta, and annexed portion of Utah and Idaho, extending from Montana (including Yellowstone Park) to the Wyoming–Utah boundary. On July 10, 1890, Wyoming was admitted to the Union with thirteen counties in it. Ten more counties were created after statehood.

Two counties were renamed after their creation. Carter County was renamed Sweetwater County on December 1, 1869. Pease County, formed in 1875, was renamed Johnson County in 1879.

The Federal Information Processing Standard (FIPS) code, which is used by the United States government to uniquely identify states and counties, is provided with each entry. Wyoming's code is 56, which when combined with any county code would be written as 56XXX. The FIPS code for each county links to census data for that county.

List

References

Wyoming, counties in
List
Counties